Ideal Homes may refer to

Companies
Ideal Homes (UK housebuilder), a defunct British housebuilder
Ideal Homes (US housebuilder), an American housebuilder